= EverythingCU.com =

Association for credit union professionals

EverythingCU.com was an online community of credit union professional. When it began in 2000, it was known as CUMarketingDept.com, and was specifically targeted to credit union marketing professionals. In 2004, the name changed to EverythingCU.com. As of November 2007, EverythingCU.com hosted 5,620 members. Online conversations cover a wide range of topics of concern to credit unions. The site used to facilitates document exchange among its members.

The site used to host educational webinars, and an annual educational and networking event for credit union professionals.

As of 2025 the domain is currently serving as host for online gaming.

== See also ==
- Category:Credit unions
